The Barn River is a small river in a remote area of the Westland district of New Zealand.

See also
List of rivers of New Zealand

References
Land Information New Zealand - Search for Place Names
 Topographical map NZMS 260 sheet: E38

Westland District
Rivers of the West Coast, New Zealand
Rivers of New Zealand